Otse is a village in the South-East District, Botswana

Otse may also refer to:
Otse, Central District, village in Central District, Botswana
Otse Hill, Botswana
OTse TV, Ukrainian TV channel, see  ICTV (Ukraine)

See also